Territorial Council elections were held in Afars and Issas on 17 November 1968. The result was a victory for the Afar Democratic Rally, which won 20 out of 32 seats.

Results

References

1968 elections in Africa
1968 in Afars and Issas
1968
November 1968 events in Africa